The women's water polo tournament at the 2015 European Games was held in Baku, Azerbaijan from 12 to 20 June 2015.

Qualification

Preliminary round
All times are local (UTC+5).

Group A

Group B

Classification round

Bracket

7–12th place quarterfinals

Eleventh place game

7–10th place semifinals

Ninth place game

Seventh place game

Final round

Bracket

Quarterfinals

Semifinals

Fifth place game

Bronze medal game

Final

Final standings

See also
Water polo at the 2015 European Games – Men's tournament

References

Women
European Games